The New Orleans Zen Temple is a dojo of the Soto Zen tradition in New Orleans, Louisiana.  Robert Livingston Roshi was the abbot until his retirement in 2016, and Richard Collins is the current abbot.  Livingston, a close disciple of Taisen Deshimaru,  founded the temple in 1984.  Before his death in 1982, Deshimaru asked Livingston to go to the United States to open a Zen dojo and teach true Zen practice in the United States. The temple is also the home of the American Zen Association, which gives support to zen dojos and publishes rare Buddhist texts.

See also

Timeline of Zen Buddhism in the United States

Buddhist temples in Louisiana
Zen centers in the United States